The WTFPL is a permissive free software license. As a public domain like license, the WTFPL is essentially the same as dedication to the public domain. It allows redistribution and modification of the work under any terms. The title is an abbreviation of "Do What The Fuck You Want To Public License".

The first version of the WTFPL, released in March 2000, was written by Banlu Kemiyatorn for his own software project. Sam Hocevar, Debian's former project leader, wrote version 2.

Characteristics 

The WTFPL intends to be a permissive, public-domain-like license. The license is not a copyleft license. The license differs from public domain in that an author can use it even if they do not necessarily have the ability to place their work in the public domain according to their local laws.

The WTFPL does not include a no-warranty disclaimer, unlike other permissive licenses, such as the MIT License. Though the WTFPL is untested in court, the official website offers a disclaimer to be used in software source code.

Terms

Version 2 
The text of Version 2, the most current version of the license, written by Sam Hocevar:

           DO WHAT THE FUCK YOU WANT TO PUBLIC LICENSE
                   Version 2, December 2004
 
Copyright (C) 2004 Sam Hocevar <sam@hocevar.net>

Everyone is permitted to copy and distribute verbatim or modified
copies of this license document, and changing it is allowed as long
as the name is changed.
 
           DO WHAT THE FUCK YOU WANT TO PUBLIC LICENSE
  TERMS AND CONDITIONS FOR COPYING, DISTRIBUTION AND MODIFICATION

 0. You just DO WHAT THE FUCK YOU WANT TO.

Version 1 
do What The Fuck you want to Public License

Version 1.0, March 2000
Copyright (C) 2000 Banlu Kemiyatorn (]d).
136 Nives 7 Jangwattana 14 Laksi Bangkok
Everyone is permitted to copy and distribute verbatim copies
of this license document, but changing it is not allowed.

Ok, the purpose of this license is simple
and you just

DO WHAT THE FUCK YOU WANT TO.

Reception

Usage 
The WTFPL is not in wide use among open-source software projects; according to Black Duck Software, the WTFPL is used by less than one percent of open-source projects.
Examples include the OpenStreetMap Potlatch online editor, the video game Liero (version 1.36), yalu102 and MediaWiki extensions. More than 5,000 Wikimedia Commons files and more than 24,000 Projects on GitHub were published under the terms of the WTFPL.

Discussion 
The license was confirmed as a GPL-compatible free software license by the Free Software Foundation, but its use is "not recommended". In 2009, the Open Source Initiative chose not to approve the license as an open-source license due to redundancy with the Fair License.

The WTFPL version 2 is an accepted Copyfree license. It is also accepted by Fedora as a free license and GPL-compatible.

Some software authors have said that the license is not very serious; forks have tried to address wording ambiguity and liability concerns. OSI founding president Eric S. Raymond interpreted the license as written satire against the restrictions of the GPL and other software licenses; WTFPL version 2 author Sam Hocevar later confirmed that the WTFPL is a parody of the GPL. Free-culture activist Nina Paley said she considered the WTFPL a free license for cultural works.

See also 
Beerware
CC0
Unlicense
License-free software
Public domain software
Software using the WTFPL (category)
 Public-domain-equivalent license

References

External links 

Free and open-source software licenses
Free content licenses
Permissive software licenses
Public copyright licenses